Abubakari Kankani (born December 25, 1976) is a Ghanaian football player currently playing at the position of goalkeeper for Norchip Sepe Timpom.

International
Kankani played from 2001 to 2003 4 international games for Ghana. He played in the 2002 African Cup of Nations in Mali as the third keeper from Ghana after James Nanor and Sammy Adjei.

References

External links
 

1976 births
Living people
Ghanaian footballers
Ghana international footballers
Footballers from Accra
King Faisal Babes FC players
Association football goalkeepers
Ghapoha Readers players